The Pondicherry cricket team (also Puducherry cricket team) is a cricket team that represents the state of Puducherry in Indian domestic competitions. In July 2018, the Board of Control for Cricket in India (BCCI) named the team as one of the nine new sides that would compete in domestic tournaments for the 2018–19 season, including the Ranji Trophy and the Vijay Hazare Trophy.

In August 2018, Abhishek Nayar, who previously played for Mumbai, decided to join the team. In September 2018, they won their opening fixture of the 2018–19 Vijay Hazare Trophy, beating Manipur by 8 wickets. However, the next day, the BCCI revoked the team's allowance around players from outside the state the team is located in, after concerns were raised that no local cricketers had played in the match. Eight players were found to be outside the BCCI's eligibility criteria.

In their first season in the Vijay Hazare Trophy, they finished in third place in the Plate Group, with five wins and two defeats from their eight matches. The other two matches finished as no results. Paras Dogra finished as the leading run-scorer, with 257 runs, and Fabid Ahmed was the leading wicket-taker for the team, with eleven dismissals.

In November 2018, they played in their first match in the Ranji Trophy, against Meghalaya, in the 2018–19 tournament. In their opening match in the tournament, Paras Dogra became the first batsman for Pondicherry to score a century in the Ranji Trophy. The match was affected by rain and finished in a draw. They finished the 2018–19 tournament third in the table, with four wins from their eight matches.

In March 2019, Pondicherry finished seventh in Group E of the 2018–19 Syed Mushtaq Ali Trophy, with one win from their seven matches. Paras Dogra was the leading run-scorer for the team in the tournament, with 255 runs, and Parandaman Thamaraikannan was the leading wicket-taker, with seven dismissals.

Squad 

Updated as on 24 January 2023

 Bowling coach - Shaun Tait
 Manager and strength and conditioning coach -  Kalpendra Jha

Famous players

References

Indian first-class cricket teams
Cricket in Puducherry
Cricket clubs established in 2018
2018 establishments in Puducherry